The Washpool National Park is a protected national park located in the New England region of New South Wales, Australia. The park has two campgrounds and is managed by the NSW National Parks & Wildlife Service. It was established in 1983 to preserve the significant plant and animal populations found in the Washpool and Gibraltar Range forests.

The Park is part of the Washpool and Gibraltar Range area of the World Heritage Site Gondwana Rainforests of Australia inscribed in 1986 and added to the Australian National Heritage List in 2007.

This natural habitat is full of diversity of plants, mammals, amphibians, reptiles and birds.

The average elevation of the terrain is 704 meters. Average summer temperatures range between 14 ° C and 26 ° C, and winter temperatures between 2 ° C and 15 ° C.

See also

 Protected areas of New South Wales
 High Conservation Value Old Growth forest

References

National parks of New South Wales
Protected areas established in 1983
Gondwana Rainforests of Australia
1983 establishments in Australia
New England (New South Wales)